Charles Arthur Banks,  (18 May 1885 – 28 September 1961) was the 17th Lieutenant Governor of British Columbia.

In New Zealand, Banks studied engineering at the Thames School of Mines and Colorado School of Mines. After obtaining his degree, Banks immigrated to British Columbia. During World War I, Banks served with the Royal Engineers.

After the war Banks resumed his career in the mining industry. Among other ventures, Banks co-founded the Placer Development Co., later Placer Dome, which was acquired by Barrick Gold in 2006.  In 1937, the Mining and Metallurgical Society of America awarded its Gold Medal to Banks for his role in the aerial development of remote mines.

During World War II, Banks served in London as the representative of the Government of Canada. His duties included management of the transportation of supplies for the war effort. His wartime service earned Banks the C.M.G.

Banks was appointed as Lieutenant-Governor on 1 October 1946 and served in that office for four years. After his term in office, Banks relocated to Vancouver where he lived until his death in 1961. Amongst the bequests in his will was a $1.1 million gift to the University of British Columbia used to establish a fund for needy students in his and his wife's name.

External links
 Lieutenant-Governor of British Columbia official website profile

Sources

1885 births
1961 deaths
People from Thames, New Zealand
Colorado School of Mines alumni
Companions of the Order of St Michael and St George
Lieutenant Governors of British Columbia
New Zealand emigrants to Canada